This is a list of United States Marine Corps aviation support squadrons and other units, sorted by type.

Active

Marine Wing Headquarters Squadrons
The Marine Wing Headquarters Squadron (MWHS) provides administrative and supply support for a Marine Aircraft Wing Headquarters (MAW HQ). The MAW HQ is a separate organization that directs and coordinates the operations of the MAW.  The MAW HQ contains the wing commander (commanding general) and assistant wing commander, their personal staffs (aides-de-camp, drivers, etc.), and the chief of staff, the general staff divisions (G-1 through G-6), and the special staff departments (public affairs officer, wing inspector, staff judge advocate, wing medical officer, and wing chaplain). The wing commander fights the MAW from his operational command post located in the Tactical Air Command Center (TACC) maintained by the Marine Air Control Group (MACG).

Marine Aviation Logistics Squadrons
The Marine Aviation Logistics Squadron (MALS) provides direct support of intermediate aircraft maintenance, avionics, aviation supply, and aviation ordnance to the aircraft squadrons of a Marine Aircraft Group. A MALS is capable of supporting multiple types of aircraft, as well as providing detachments for the aviation combat elements of a MEB or MEU.

Marine Air Control Squadrons
MACS are responsible for air traffic control and operate the Tactical Air Operations Center (TAOC), which directs antiair warfare (to include ground-based anti-aircraft weapons), early warning & intercept control, air surveillance, radar control, and airspace management.

Marine Air Support Squadrons
MASSs provide the Direct Air Support Center (DASC) which controls and coordinates those tactical aircraft operations directly supporting ground forces. They are responsible for the processing of immediate requests (e.g. Close Air Support, CASEVAC, and Assault Support), integrate and deconflict indirect fire support (e.g., artillery and mortars) with aviation assets, manage terminal control assets, and procedurally controlling aircraft.

Marine Tactical Air Command Squadrons

MTACS provide the ACE commander with command and control functions necessary for the aviation mission. They establish a Tactical Air Command Center (TACC), which is the operational command post for the Marine Aircraft Wing, from which the Wing Commander and his battle staff command the tactical air battle, including tactical air support provided to ground forces (directed from the DASC in the MASS) and tactical air defense (directed by the TAOC in the MACS).

Marine Wing Communications Squadrons

MWCSs provide all communication assets for the ACE, including radio, satellite, wire, and data technology.

Littoral Anti-Air Battalions
The Marine Corps activated its first Littoral Anti-Air Battalion (LAAB) on February 11, 2022.  LAABs are designed to provide ground based air defense, early warning, tactical air control, and Forward arming and refuelling points in support of Marine Corps littoral operations.

Low Altitude Air Defense Battalions

LAAD Battalions are responsible for close air defense protection of assets within the area of operation, with a secondary mission of local ground security for ACE elements. They are armed with surface to air weapons, as well as early warning and detection equipment. Currently, LAAD battalions are equipped with the FIM-92 Stinger, a man-portable surface-to-air missile, and the M2 .50 cal machinegun. The M1097 Avenger missile-equipped HMMWV has been retired by Marine forces.

Marine Wing Support Squadrons/Detachments
The MWSS provides all essential aviation ground support to the MAG to operate an airfield. This support includes: (1) airfield services (aviation terminal operations, airfield expeditionary systems/ air field lighting, and aircraft crash rescue and firefighting/ emergency services), 2) communications (less air traffic control services), (3) motor transport, (4) engineer services (construction, maintenance, and utilities), 4) bulk fuel delivery and containment, (5) aircraft refueling, (6) non-aviation (i.e., "ground") supply, (7) non-aviation equipment maintenance, (8) local security, (9) food service, and (10) medical services (provided by U.S. Navy personnel).

Headquarters and Headquarters Squadrons

A H&HS usually consists of the headquarters group (the station commanding general/commanding officer and staff), the squadron headquarters (commanding officer and staff), public affairs and journalism, facilities planning & maintenance, billeting and family housing offices, station motor pool, air traffic control, meteorology, fuels, ordnance, other aviation support, Aircraft Rescue and Firefighting, Provost Marshal section, station Judge Advocate's Office, station Chaplain, Navy medical facility, and Marine Corps Community Service, which usually hosts services such as a Marine Corps Exchamge (MCX) (i.e., post exchange), commissary, gas station, barber shop, dry cleaner, library, theater, golf course, bowling center, fitness, recreation, hobby, craft and auto repair center(s), swimming pool, officer, SNCO, NCO clubs, family services, Single Marine Program, and other personal services vendors.

Combat Logistics Companies

Combat Logistics Companies, while subordinate to a Marine Logistics Group provide intermediate ground logistics support to aviation units, to include supply and maintenance beyond organic capabilities. All Marine air stations not in proximity to a Marine Logistics Group have a tenant company.

Decommissioned
Squadrons/Detachments are listed by their last designation.

GCI & Early Warning Detachments (1941-1943)

Air Warning Squadrons

Assault Air Warning Squadrons

Assault Air Warning Squadrons were United States Marine Corps aviation command and control units formed during World War II to provide early warning, aerial surveillance, and ground controlled interception during the early phases of amphibious landing.  These squadrons were supposed to be fielded lightweight radars and control center gear in order to operate for a limited duration at the beginning of any operation until larger air warning squadrons came ashore. They were originally formed as Air Warning Squadron (Air Transportable) however their deisgnators changed in July/August 1944 due to the inability to field an air transportable radar. Four of these squadrons were commissioned during the war with one, AWS(AT)-5, taking part in the Battle of Saipan. All four squadrons were decommissioned in November 1944.

Aircraft Engineering Squadrons
Aircraft Engineering Squadrons were responsible for training aircraft maintenance and service personnel.  The squadrons were originally formed during World War II and were in existence into the early 1950s.

Landing Force Air Support Control Units

Light Anti-Aircraft Missile battalions

Low Altitude Air Defense Battalions

Marine Air Base Squadrons

Headquarters & Maintenance Squadrons & Marine Aviation Logistics Squadrons

Marine Air Control Squadrons

Marine Air Support Squadrons

Marine Air Traffic Control Units

Marine Air Traffic Control Squadrons
The Marine Air Traffic Control Squadrons (MATCS) were formed through the consolidation of regionally aligned Marine Air Traffic Control Units, underneath each Marine Air Wing. The first MATCS was commissioned in 1976 with the last one commissioning in the reserves in 1980.  The MATCS provided all-weather, air traffic control services at expeditionary airfields and remote area landing sites in support of Fleet Marine Force operations as part of the Marine Air Command and Control System (MACCS).

Marine Tactical Air Control Squadrons

Marine Wing Support Squadrons

Citations

References

Bibliography
 

Web

See also

 United States Marine Corps aviation
 List of United States Marine Corps aircraft groups
 List of decommissioned United States Marine Corps aircraft squadrons
 List of United States Marine Corps battalions
 List of United States Marine Corps installations

Aviation support squadrons